Dong-hoon, also spelled Tong-hoon or Dong-hun, is a Korean masculine given name. Its meaning differs based on the hanja used to write each syllable of the name. There are 24 hanja with the reading "dong" and 12 hanja with the reading "hoon" on the South Korean government's official list of hanja which may be registered for use in given names.

Chung Dong-hoon (born 1932), South Korean boxer
Choi Dong-hoon (born 1971), South Korean film director
Hoon Lee (born Tong-hoon Lee, 1973), American stage and film actor of Korean descent
Haha (entertainer) (born Ha Dong-hoon, 1979), South Korean actor
Primary (musician) (born Choi Dong-hoon, 1983), South Korean hip hop musician
Nam Dong-hoon (born 1984), South Korean modern pentathlete
Lee Dong-whun (born 1987), South Korean figure skater
Cha Dong-hoon (born 1989), South Korean footballer
Yang Tong-hun, North Korean politician, member of the 7th Central Committee of the Workers' Party of Korea
Han Dong-hoon (born 1973), South Korean prosecutor and 69th Minister of Justice of South Korea

See also
Yoon Dong-hun (born 1983), South Korean footballer
List of Korean given names

References

Korean masculine given names